The GameCube is Nintendo's fifth home video game console, released during the sixth generation of video games. It is the successor to the Nintendo 64, and was first launched in Japan on September 14, 2001, followed by a launch in North America on November 18, 2001, and a launch in Europe on May 3, 2002. The successor to the GameCube is the Wii, which was first released in North America on November 19, 2006, and is backward compatible with GameCube games, memory cards, and controllers. Later models RVL-101 and RVL-201 would not feature backwards compatibility. For a list of games that were announced or in development for the GameCube but never released, see the list of cancelled GameCube games.

Games
There are  games on this list. It is organized alphabetically by the games' localized English titles, or by rōmaji transliterations when exclusive to Japan. For a chronological list, sort by the release date columns.

Bonus discs and demo discs

See also
List of Player's Choice titles for GameCube
List of PlayStation 2 games
List of Xbox games
List of Dreamcast games

Notes

References

GameCube games
GameCube games
GameCube